Barmada is a surname. Notable people with the name include:

 Abdul Qader Barmada (1911–2000), Syrian politician
 Mustafa Bey Barmada (1883–1953), Syrian statesman and politician 
 Rashad Barmada (1913–1988), Syrian statesman and politician 
 Riad Barmada (1929–2014), Syrian-American orthopedic surgeon
 Sami J Barmada (born 1976), American neuroscientist
 Shahd Barmada (born 1988), Syrian singer

Arabic-language surnames
Barmada family
Syrian families
Political families of Syria